Extravagance is a lost 1921 American silent melodrama film, directed by Phil Rosen. It stars May Allison, Robert Edeson, and Theodore Von Eltz, and was released on March 7, 1921.

Cast list
 May Allison as Nancy Brown
 Robert Edeson as Richard Vane
 Theodore Von Eltz as Dick Vane
 William Courtwright as Pa Brown
 Grace Pike as Ma Brown
 Lawrence Grant as Uncle Mark

References

External links

 
 
 

Films directed by Phil Rosen
Metro Pictures films
Melodrama films
American silent feature films
American black-and-white films
Silent American drama films
1921 drama films
1921 films
1920s American films